Tomas Ledin released his first LP in 1972, which he recorded when he was just 19 years old. Since then, he has become one of the most successful Swedish singer/songwriters of the 1970s, 1980s, 1990s and 2000s. He has released numerous albums and has had many hit singles, charting in the Swedish Singles Chart as well as the important Swedish radio charts Svensktoppen and Trackslistan.

Albums

Studio albums

Live albums

Compilation albums

Extended plays

Singles and charted songs

The following list includes the singles which were released by Tomas Ledin as well as other songs that managed to reach one of the two most important radio charts in Sweden, Svensktoppen and Trackslistan. It is important to note that not all of the listed titles were released as physical singles. If a song only appears on one of the radio charts and did not show up on the sales chart, it is a good indication that it wasn't available as a physical single, other than promo-releases.

In order to show how popular an artist like Tomas Ledin was and is in Sweden, the inclusion of the most important radio charts is necessary. As Stefan Heiding, author of several charts books, put it: "only these lists show how popular an artist or a song really was".

The following charts are included:
Sverigetopplistan: the official Swedish singles chart, based on sales
Svensktoppen: popular and important Swedish radio chart, based on votes. It has existed ever since 1962, with a short break between 1982 and 1985. Svensktoppen is compiled as a top 10 and has strict rules as to the inclusion of a song (like having to be sung in Swedish, which has changed recently).
Trackslistan: Swedish radio chart, from 1984 until 2010. It was compiled as a top 20, and international acts were also included. 
Heta högen (HH): predecessor of Trackslistan and successor of Tio i Topp; it ran from 1974 until 1984 in the radio show Poporama and included songs voted in by the listeners. The songs were not presented in list-form, which means that no positions were available, just the number of weeks a song stayed on the chart. Depending on the year, each week's Heta högen featured a minimum of four to a maximum of 12 songs. 
Digilistan: Swedish radio show, which publishes a chart with the same name, featuring a top 60 of the most sold song titles in digital formats. The chart was first published in January 2007. 

 entry in Tio i Topp, predecessor of Trackslistan

References

 

Discographies of Swedish artists